The Château de Bourron is a château in Bourron-Marlotte, Seine-et-Marne, France.

History
The present château, which was built to replace a medieval castle, dates back to the 16th century, shortly after François de Sallard married Diane Clausse, whose father was Finance Secretary to Henri II and brought in a large dowry which proved necessary for its construction.

In 1725, Polish King Stanisław Leszczyński was in exile here.

In 1794, during the French Revolution, sans-culottes from Nemours went on a rampage and pillaged the château.

Since 1878 it has been owned by the Montesquiou family.

In 2016, It was used for the filming location used for Louis' Castle in the first episode of Shopping King Louie.

Bibliography
Nicole Benefice, Le Château de Bourron (caisse nationale des monuments historiques, 1984).

References

Châteaux in Seine-et-Marne
Castles in Île-de-France